Alexandru Koller (German: Alexander Köller), (born 20 April 1953 in Cehu Silvaniei, Sălaj, Romania), is a former football player turned businessman.

He played for Unirea Zalău, ASA Târgu Mureş and FC Baia Mare.

Koller won five caps for Romania in 1976 against Iran, in 1978 against Poland, in 1979 against East Germany, Poland and USSR.

He scored a goal from a penalty kick in the 1981–82 Cupa României final, which FC Baia Mare lost with 3–2 against Dinamo București.
On 27 September 1982, Alexandru Koller scored at Santiago Bernabéu, opening the score for FC Baia Mare in a European Cup Winners' Cup second leg match against Real Madrid. At that time, the Romanian team was playing in Divizia B, the second division. Eventually, Real Madrid won by 5 goals to 2.

He retired from football in 1983, aged only 30, to become vice-president of FC Baia Mare and then between 1990 and 1996 he was president and owner of the club.

Ákos Koller, his nephew, played for Videoton FC Fehérvár and Hungary being one of the best centre backs of the Hungarian first league championship.

Honours
FC Baia Mare
Divizia B: 1977–78, 1982–83
Cupa României Runner-up: 1981–82

Notes

References

External links

1953 births
Living people
People from Cehu Silvaniei
Romanian footballers
Romania international footballers
Liga I players
Liga II players
ASA Târgu Mureș (1962) players
CS Minaur Baia Mare (football) players
Association football defenders
FC Baia Mare presidents